The LEB Catalan basketball league is the 2nd-tier level regional professional preseason basketball competition that is organized by the Catalan Basketball Federation since 2000, in Catalonia, Spain. Catalan LEB (Spanish 2nd Division) teams play in this competition.

In some years, the winning team of this competition has also played in the top-tier level Lliga Catalana with the Liga ACB (Spanish 1st Division) teams from Catalonia.

Performance by club

Lliga Catalana LEB Gold History

2022 Lliga Catalana LEB

Finals

2021 Lliga Catalana LEB

Qualification

Final

Source: FCBQ

2020 Lliga Catalana LEB

Final

Source: FCBQ

2019 Lliga Catalana LEB

Group 1

Group 2

Final Four

2018 Lliga Catalana LEB

Finals

Source: FCBQ

2017 Lliga Catalana LEB

Group 1

Group 2

Final

Source: FCBQ

2016 Lliga Catalana LEB

Finals

Source: FCBQ

2015 Lliga Catalana LEB

Finals

2014 Lliga Catalana LEB

Final Four

Source: FCBQ

2013 Lliga Catalana LEB

Finals

Source: FCBQ

2012 Lliga Catalana LEB

Final Four

Source: FCBQ

2011 Lliga Catalana LEB

Qualification

Final

Source: FCBQ

2010 Lliga Catalana LEB

Qualification

Final

Source: FCBQ

2009 Lliga Catalana LEB

Group 1

Group 2

Final

Source: FCBQ

2008 Lliga Catalana LEB

Group 1

Group 2

Final

Source: FCBQ

2007 Lliga Catalana LEB

Final Four

Lliga Catalana LEB Silver History

External links
 Catalan Basketball Federation website
 History of Catalan Leagues

Basketball in Catalonia
3
Cat